The McMahon–Hussein Correspondence is a series of letters that were exchanged during World War I in which the Government of the United Kingdom agreed to recognize Arab independence in a large region after the war in exchange for the Sharif of Mecca launching the Arab Revolt against the Ottoman Empire. The correspondence had a significant influence on Middle Eastern history during and after the war; a dispute over Palestine continued thereafter.

The correspondence is composed of ten letters that were exchanged from July 1915 to March 1916 between Hussein bin Ali, Sharif of Mecca and Lieutenant Colonel Sir Henry McMahon, British High Commissioner to Egypt. Whilst there was some military value in the Arab manpower and local knowledge alongside the British Army, the primary reason for the arrangement was to counteract the Ottoman declaration of jihad ("holy war") against the Allies, and to maintain the support of the 70 million Muslims in British India (particularly those in the Indian Army that had been deployed in all major theatres of the wider war). The area of Arab independence was defined to be "in the limits and boundaries proposed by the Sherif of Mecca" with the exception of "portions of Syria" lying to the west of "the districts of Damascus, Homs, Hama and Aleppo"; conflicting interpretations of this description were to cause great controversy in subsequent years. One particular dispute, which continues to the present, is the extent of the coastal exclusion.

Following the publication of the November 1917 Balfour Declaration (a letter written by British Foreign Secretary Arthur James Balfour to Baron Rothschild, a wealthy and prominent leader in the British Jewish community), which promised a national home for the Jews in Palestine, and the subsequent leaking of the secret 1916 Sykes–Picot Agreement in which Britain and France proposed to split and occupy parts of the territory, the Sharif and other Arab leaders considered the agreements made in the McMahon–Hussein Correspondence had been violated. Hussein refused to ratify the 1919 Treaty of Versailles and, in response to a 1921 British proposal to sign a treaty accepting the Mandate system, stated that he could not be expected to "affix his name to a document assigning Palestine to the Zionists and Syria to foreigners". A further British attempt to reach a treaty failed in 1923–24, with negotiations suspended in March 1924; within six months, the British withdrew their support in favour of their central Arabian ally Ibn Saud, who proceeded to conquer Hussein's kingdom.

The correspondence "haunted Anglo-Arab relations" for many decades thereafter. In January 1923, unofficial excerpts were published by Joseph N. M. Jeffries in the Daily Mail and copies of the letters circulated in the Arab press. Excerpts were published in the 1937 Peel Commission Report and the correspondence was published in full in George Antonius's 1938 book The Arab Awakening, then officially in 1939 as Cmd. 5957. Further documents were declassified in 1964.

Background

Initial discussions 
The first documented discussions between the UK and the Hashemites took place in February 1914, five months prior to the outbreak of World War I. Discussions were between the Consul-General in Egypt Lord Kitchener and Abdullah bin al-Hussein, the second son of Hussein bin Ali, Sharif of Mecca. Hussein had grown uncomfortable with the newly appointed Ottoman governor in his Hejaz Vilayet, Wehib Pasha, reflecting on rising tensions since the 1908 completion of the Hejaz railway, which threatened to support increased Ottoman centralization in the region. Discussions culminated in a telegram sent on 1 November 1914 from Kitchener—who had recently been appointed as Secretary of War—to Hussein wherein Great Britain would, in exchange for support from the Arabs of Hejaz, "...guarantee the independence, rights and privileges of the Sharifate against all external foreign aggression, in particular, that of the Ottomans". The Sharif indicated he could not break with the Ottomans immediately but the entry of the Ottomans on Germany's side in World War I on 11 November 1914 brought about an abrupt shift in British political interests concerning an Arab revolt against the Ottomans. According to historian David Charlwood, the failure in Gallipoli led to an increased desire on the part of the UK to negotiate a deal with the Arabs. Lieshout gives further background on the reasoning behind the shift in British thinking.

Damascus Protocol 

On 23 May 1915, Emir Faisal bin Hussein—the third son of Hussein—was presented with the document that became known as the Damascus Protocol. Faisal was in Damascus to resume talks with the Arab secret societies al-Fatat and Al-'Ahd that he had met in March/April; in the interim he had visited Istanbul to confront the Grand Vizier with evidence of an Ottoman plot to depose his father. The document declared the Arabs would revolt in alliance with the United Kingdom and in return the UK would recognize Arab independence in an area running from the 37th parallel near the Taurus Mountains on the southern border of Turkey, to be bounded in the east by Persia and the Persian Gulf, in the west by the Mediterranean Sea and in the south by the Arabian Sea.

Letters, July 1915 to March 1916 

Following deliberations at Ta'if between Hussein and his sons in June 1915, during which Faisal counselled caution, Ali argued against rebellion and Abdullah advocated action and encouraged his father to enter into correspondence with Sir Henry McMahon; over the period 14 July 1915 to 10 March 1916. Ten letters—five from each side—were exchanged between Sir Henry McMahon and Sharif Hussein. McMahon was in contact with British Foreign Secretary Edward Grey throughout; Grey was to authorise and be ultimately responsible for the correspondence.

Historians have used an excerpt from a private letter sent on 4 December 1915 by McMahon halfway through the eight-month period of the correspondence as evidence of possible British duplicity:
[I do not take] the idea of a future strong united independent Arab State ... too seriously ... the conditions of Arabia do not and will not for a very long time to come, lend themselves to such a thing ... I do not for one moment go to the length of imagining that the present negotiations will go far to shape the future form of Arabia or to either establish our rights or to bind our hands in that country. The situation and its elements are much too nebulous for that. What we have to arrive at now is to tempt the Arab people into the right path, detach them from the enemy and bring them on to our side. This on our part is at present largely a matter of words, and to succeed we must use persuasive terms and abstain from academic haggling over conditions – whether about Baghdad or elsewhere.

The ten letters are summarised in the table below, from the letters published in full in 1939 as Cmd. 5957:

Legal status 

Elie Kedourie said the October letter was not a treaty and that even if it was considered to be a treaty, Hussein failed to fulfil his promises from his 18 February 1916 letter. Arguing to the contrary, Victor Kattan describes the correspondence as a "secret treaty" and references  that includes the correspondence. He also argues the UK government considered it to be a treaty during the 1919 Paris Peace Conference negotiations with the French over the disposal of Ottoman territory.

Arab Revolt, June 1916 to October 1918 

McMahon's promises were seen by the Arabs as a formal agreement between themselves and the United Kingdom. British Prime Minister David Lloyd George and Foreign Secretary Arthur Balfour represented the agreement as a treaty during the post-war deliberations of the Council of Four. On this understanding the Arabs, under the command of Hussein's son Faisal, established a military force that fought, with inspiration from T. E. Lawrence ("Lawrence of Arabia"), against the Ottoman Empire during the Arab Revolt. In an intelligence memo written in January 1916 Lawrence described Sherif Hussein's Arab Revolt as:

beneficial to us, because it marches with our immediate aims, the break up of the Islamic 'bloc' and the defeat and disruption of the Ottoman Empire, and because the states [Sharif Hussein] would set up to succeed the Turks would be … harmless to ourselves … The Arabs are even less stable than the Turks. If properly handled they would remain in a state of political mosaic, a tissue of small jealous principalities incapable of cohesion (emphasis in original).

In June 1916, the Arab Revolt began when an Arab army moved against Ottoman forces. They participated in the capture of Aqabah and the severing of the Hejaz railway, a strategic link through the Arab peninsula that ran from Damascus to Medina. Meanwhile, the Egyptian Expeditionary Force under the command of General Allenby advanced into the Ottoman territories of Palestine and Syria. The British advance culminated in the Battle of Megiddo in September 1918 and the capitulation of the Ottoman Empire on 31 October 1918.

The Arab revolt is seen by historians as the first organized movement of Arab nationalism. It brought together Arab groups with the common goal to fight for independence from the Ottoman Empire for the first time. Much of the history of Arabian independence stemmed from the revolt beginning with the kingdom founded by Hussein. After the war was over, the Arab revolt had implications. Groups of people were classified according to whether they had fought in the revolt or and their ranks. In Iraq, a group of Sharifian officers from the Arab Revolt formed a political party of which they were head. The Hashemite kingdom in Jordan is still influenced by the actions of Arab leaders in the revolt.

Related commitments, May 1916 to November 1918

Sykes–Picot Agreement 

The Sykes–Picot Agreement between the UK and France was negotiated from the end of November 1915 until its agreement in principle on 3 January 1916. The French government became aware of the UK's correspondence with Hussein during December 1915 but were not aware formal commitments had been made.

The agreement was exposed in December 1917; it was made public by the Bolsheviks after the Russian Revolution, showing the countries were planning to split and occupy parts of the promised Arab country. Hussein was satisfied by two disingenuous telegrams from Sir Reginald Wingate, who had replaced McMahon as High Commissioner of Egypt, assuring him the British commitments to the Arabs were still valid and that the Sykes–Picot Agreement was not a formal treaty.
After the Sykes-Picot Agreement was published by the Russian government, McMahon resigned.

Many sources contend the Sykes-Picot Agreement conflicted with the Hussein–McMahon Correspondence of 1915–1916. There were several points of difference, the most obvious being that Persia was placed in the British area and less obviously, the idea British and French advisors would be in control of the area designated as an Arab State. While the correspondence does not mention Palestine, Haifa and Acre were to be British and a reduced Palestine area was to be internationalized.

Balfour Declaration 

In 1917, the UK issued the Balfour Declaration, promising to support the establishment of a national home for the Jewish people in Palestine. The declaration and the correspondence, as well as the Sykes-Picot agreement, are frequently considered together by historians because of the potential for incompatibility between them, particularly in regard to the disposition of Palestine. According to Albert Hourani, founder of the Middle East Centre at St Antony's College, Oxford; "The argument about the interpretation of these agreements is one which is impossible to end, because they were intended to bear more than one interpretation".

Hogarth message 

Hussein asked for an explanation of the Balfour Declaration and in January 1918 Commander David Hogarth, head of the Arab Bureau in Cairo, was dispatched to Jeddah to deliver a letter that was written by Sir Mark Sykes on behalf of the UK government to Hussein, who was now King of Hejaz. The Hogarth message assured Hussein "the Arab race shall be given full opportunity of once again forming a nation in the world" and referred to " ... the freedom of the existing population both economic and political ...". According to Isaiah Friedman and Kedourie, Hussein accepted the Balfour Declaration  while Charles D. Smith said both Friedman and Kedourie misrepresent documents and violate scholarly standards to reach their conclusions. Hogarth reported that Hussein "would not accept an independent Jewish State in Palestine, nor was I instructed to warn him that such a state was contemplated by Great Britain".

Declaration to the Seven 

In light of the existing McMahon–Hussein correspondence and in the wake of the seemingly competing Balfour Declaration for the Zionists, as well as Russia's publication weeks later of the older and previously secret Sykes–Picot Agreement with the Russia and France, seven Syrian notables in Cairo from the newly formed Syrian Party of Unity (Hizb al-Ittibad as-Suri) issued a memorandum requesting clarification from the UK Government, including a "guarantee of the ultimate independence of Arabia". In response, issued on 16 June 1918, the Declaration to the Seven stated that British policy was that the future government of the regions of the Ottoman Empire that were occupied by Allied forces in World War I should be based on the consent of the governed.

Allenby's assurance to Faisal 
On 19 October 1918, General Allenby reported to the UK Government that he had given Faisal:
official assurance that whatever measures might be taken during the period of military administration they were purely provisional and could not be allowed to prejudice the final settlement by the peace conference, at which no doubt the Arabs would have a representative. I added that the instructions to the military governors would preclude their mixing in political affairs, and that I should remove them if I found any of them contravening these orders. I reminded the Amir Faisal that the Allies were in honour bound to endeavour to reach a settlement in accordance with the wishes of the peoples concerned and urged him to place his trust whole-heartedly in their good faith.

Anglo-French Declaration of 1918

In the Anglo-French Declaration of 7 November 1918 the two governments stated that:The object aimed at by France and the United Kingdom in prosecuting in the East the War let loose by the ambition of Germany is the complete and definite emancipation of the peoples so long oppressed by the Turks and the establishment of national governments and administrations deriving their authority from the initiative and free choice of the indigenous populations.
According to civil servant Eyre Crowe, who saw the original draft of the Declaration, "we had issued a definite statement against annexation in order (1) to quiet the Arabs and (2) to prevent the French annexing any part of Syria". The Declaration is considered by historians to have been misleading at best.

Post-War outcome, 1919 to 1925

Sherifian Plan

One day before the end of the war with the Ottomans, the British Foreign Office discussed T.E. Lawrence's "Sherifian Plan", in which Hussein's sons were proposed as puppet monarchs in Syria and Mesopotamia. Part of the rationale was to satisfy a belief among the British public that a debt was owed to the Hashemites under the McMahon correspondence. Of Hussein's sons, Faisal was Lawrence's clear favourite, while Ali was not considered a strong leader, Zaid was considered to be too young and Abdullah was considered to be lazy.

Mandates

The Paris Peace Conference between the allies to agree territorial divisions after the war was held in 1919. The correspondence was primarily relevant to the regions that were to become Palestine, Transjordan, Lebanon, Syria, Mesopotamia (Iraq) and the Arabian Peninsula. At the conference, Prince Faisal, speaking on behalf of King Hussein, did not ask for immediate Arab independence but recommended an Arab state under a British mandate.

On 6 January 1920, Prince Faisal initialed an agreement with French Prime Minister Georges Clemenceau that acknowledged "the right of the Syrians to unite to govern themselves as an independent nation". A Pan-Syrian Congress, meeting in Damascus, declared an independent state of Syria on 8 March 1920. The new state included portions of Syria, Palestine and northern Mesopotamia, which under the Sykes–Picot Agreement had been set aside for an independent Arab state or confederation of states. Faisal was declared the head of state as king. The April 1920 the San Remo conference was hastily convened in response to Faisal's declaration. At the conference, the Allied Supreme Council granted the mandates for Palestine and Mesopotamia to Britain, and those for Syria and Lebanon to France.

The United Kingdom and France agreed to recognize the provisional independence of Syria and Mesopotamia. Provisional recognition of Palestinian independence was not mentioned. France had decided to govern Syria directly and took action to enforce the French Mandate of Syria before the terms had been accepted by the Council of the League of Nations. The French intervened militarily at the Battle of Maysalun in June 1920, deposing the indigenous Arab government and removing King Faisal from Damascus in August 1920. In Palestine, the United Kingdom appointed a High Commissioner and established their own mandatory regime. The January-1919 Faisal–Weizmann Agreement was a short-lived agreement for Arab–Jewish cooperation on the development of a Jewish homeland in Palestine, which Faisal had mistakenly understood was to be within the Arab kingdom. Faisal did treat Palestine differently in his presentation to the Peace Conference on 6 February 1919, saying, "Palestine, in consequence of its universal character, be left on one side for the mutual consideration of all parties concerned".

The agreement was never implemented. At the same conference, US Secretary of State Robert Lansing had asked Dr. Weizmann if the Jewish national home meant the establishment of an autonomous Jewish government. The head of the Zionist delegation had replied in the negative. Lansing was a member of the American Commission to Negotiate Peace at Paris in 1919; he said the system of mandates was a device created by the Great Powers to conceal their division of the spoils of war under the colour of international law. If the territories had been ceded directly, the value of the former German and Ottoman territories would have been applied to offset the Allies' claims for war reparations. He also said Jan Smuts had been the author of the original concept.

Hussein's downfall
In 1919, King Hussein had refused to ratify the Treaty of Versailles. After February 1920, the British ceased to pay subsidy to him. In August 1920, five days after the signing of the Treaty of Sèvres, which formally recognized the Kingdom of Hejaz, Curzon asked Cairo to procure Hussein's signature to both treaties and agreed to make a payment of £30,000 conditional on signature. Hussein declined and in 1921, stated that he could not be expected to "affix his name to a document assigning Palestine to the Zionists and Syria to foreigners".

Following the 1921 Cairo Conference, Lawrence was sent to try and obtain the King's signature to a treaty in exchange for a proposed £100,000 annual subsidy; this attempt also failed. During 1923, the British again tried to settle outstanding issues with Hussein; this attempt also failed and Hussein continued refusing to recognize any of the mandates he perceived as being his domain. In March 1924, having briefly considered the possibility of removing the offending article from the treaty, the UK government suspended negotiations and within six months withdrew support in favour of its central Arabian ally Ibn Saud, who proceeded to conquer Hussein's kingdom.

Territorial reservations and Palestine

McMahon's letter to Hussein dated 24 October 1915 declared Britain's willingness to recognize the independence of the Arabs subject to certain exemptions. The original correspondence was conducted in both English and Arabic; slightly differing English translations are extant.

The correspondence was written first in English before being translated to Arabic and vice versa; the identity of the writer and translator is unclear. Kedourie and others assumed the likeliest candidate for primary author is Ronald Storrs. In his memoirs, Storrs said the correspondence was prepared by Husayn Ruhi and then checked by Storrs. The Arab delegations to the 1939 Conference had objected to certain translations of text from Arabic to English and the Committee arranged for mutually agreeable translations that would render the English text "free from actual error".

"Portions of Syria" debate
The debate regarding Palestine arose because Palestine is not explicitly mentioned in the McMahon–Hussein Correspondence but is included within the boundaries that were initially proposed by Hussein. McMahon accepted the boundaries of Hussein "subject to modification" and suggested the modification that "portions of Syria lying to the west of the districts of Damascus, Homs, Hama and Aleppo cannot be said to be purely Arab and should be excluded". Until 1920, British government documents suggested that Palestine was intended to be part of the Arab area; their interpretation changed in 1920 leading to public disagreement between the Arabs and the British, each side producing supporting arguments for their positions based on fine details of the wording and the historical circumstances of the correspondence. Jonathan Schneer provides an analogy to explain the central dispute over the meaning:
Presume a line extending from the districts of New York, New Haven, New London, and Boston, excluding territory west from an imaginary coastal kingdom. If by districts one means "vicinity" or "environs," that is one thing with regard to the land excluded, but if one means "vilayets" or "provinces," or in the American instance "states," it is another altogether. There are no states of Boston, New London, or New Haven, just as there were no provinces of Hama and Homs, but there is a state of New York, just as there was a vilayet of Damascus, and territory to the west of New York State is different from territory to the west of the district of New York, presumably New York City and environs, just as territory to the west of the vilayet of Damascus is different from territory to the west of the district of Damascus, presumably the city of Damascus and its environs.

More than 50 years after his initial report interpreting the correspondence for the British Foreign Office, Arnold J. Toynbee published his perspectives on the continuing academic debate. Toynbee set out the logical consequences of interpreting McMahon's 'districts' or 'wilayahs' as provinces rather than vicinities:
(i) First alternative: McMahon was completely ignorant of Ottoman administrative geography. He did not know that the Ottoman vilayet of Aleppo extended westward to the coast, and he did not know that there were no Ottoman vilayets of Homs and Hama. It seems to me incredible that McMahon can have been as ill-informed as this, and that he would not have taken care to inform himself correctly when he was writing a letter in which he was making very serious commitments on HMG's account.
(ii) Second alternative: McMahon was properly acquainted with Ottoman administrative geography, and was using the word 'wilayahs' equivocally. Apropos of Damascus, he was using it to mean 'Ottoman provinces'; apropos of Homs and Hama, and Aleppo, he was using it to mean 'environs'. This equivocation would have been disingenuous, impolitic, and pointless. I could not, and still cannot, believe that McMahon behaved so irresponsibly.

"Without detriment to France" debate
In the letter of 24 October, the English version reads: " ... we accept those limits and boundaries; and in regard to those portions of the territories therein in which Great Britain is free to act without detriment to the interests of her ally France" At a meeting in Whitehall in December 1920 the English and Arabic texts of McMahon's correspondence with Sharif Husein were compared. As one official, who was present, said:

In the Arabic version sent to King Husain this is so translated as to make it appear that Gt Britain is free to act without detriment to France in the whole of the limits mentioned. This passage of course had been our sheet anchor: it enabled us to tell the French that we had reserved their rights, and the Arabs that there were regions in which they wd have eventually to come to terms with the French. It is extremely awkward to have this piece of solid ground cut from under our feet. I think that HMG will probably jump at the opportunity of making a sort of amende by sending Feisal to Mesopotamia.

James Barr wrote that although McMahon had intended to reserve the French interests, he became a victim of his own cleverness because the translator Ruhi lost the qualifying sense of the sentence in the Arabic version. In a Cabinet analysis of diplomatic developments prepared in May 1917 The Hon. William Ormsby-Gore, MP, wrote: 

Declassified British Cabinet papers include a telegram dated 18 October 1915 from Sir Henry McMahon to the Secretary of State for Foreign Affairs, Lord Grey requesting instructions. McMahon described conversations with a Muhammed Sharif al-Faruqi, a member of the Abd party who said the British could satisfy the demands of the Syrian Nationalists for the independence of Arabia. Faroqi had said the Arabs would fight if the French attempted to occupy the cities of Damascus, Homs, Hama and Aleppo, but he thought they would accept some modification of the north-western boundaries proposed by the Sherif of Mecca. Based on these conversations, McMahon suggested the language; "In so far as Britain was free to act without detriment to the interests of her present Allies, Great Britain accepts the principle of the independence of Arabia within limits propounded by the Sherif of Mecca". Lord Grey authorized McMahon to pledge the areas requested by the Sharif subject to the reserve for the Allies.

Arab position

The Arab position was that they could not refer to Palestine because that lay well to the south of the named places. In particular, the Arabs argued the vilayet (province) of Damascus did not exist and that the district (sanjak) of Damascus only covered the area surrounding the city and that Palestine was part of the vilayet of Syria A-Sham, which was not mentioned in the exchange of letters. Supporters of this interpretation also note that during the war, thousands of proclamations were dropped in all parts of Palestine carrying a message from the Sharif Hussein on one side and a message from the British Command on the other, saying "that an Anglo-Arab agreement had been arrived at securing the independence of the Arabs".

British position

The undated memorandum GT 6185 (from CAB 24/68/86) of November 1918 was prepared by the British historian Arnold Toynbee in 1918 while working in the Political Intelligence Department. Crowe, the Permanent Under-Secretary, ordered them to be placed in the Foreign Office dossier for the Peace Conference. After arriving in Paris, General Jan Smuts required that the memoranda be summarized and Toynbee produced the document GT 6506  (maps illustrating it are GT6506A 
). The two last were circulated as E.C.2201 and considered at a meeting of the Eastern Committee (No.41) of the Cabinet on 5 December 1918, which was chaired by Lord Curzon,  Jan Smuts, Lord Balfour, Lord Robert Cecil, General Sir Henry Wilson, Chief of the Imperial General Staff; representatives of the Foreign Office, the India Office, the Admiralty, the War Office, and the Treasury were present. T. E. Lawrence also attended.

The Eastern Committee met nine times in November and December to draft a set of resolutions on British policy for the benefit of the negotiators.On 21 October, the War Cabinet asked Smuts to prepare the summarized peace brief and Smuts asked Erle Richards to carry out this task. Richards distilled Toynbee's GT6506 and the resolutions of the Eastern Committee into a "P-memo" (P-49) for use by the Peace Conference delegates.

In the public arena, Balfour was criticized in the House of Commons when the Liberals and Labour Socialists moved a resolution "That secret treaties with the allied governments should be revised, since, in their present form, they are inconsistent with the object for which this country entered the war and are, therefore, a barrier to a democratic peace". In response to growing criticism arising from the seemingly contradictory commitments undertaken by the United Kingdom in the McMahon-Hussein correspondence, the Sykes–Picot Agreement and the Balfour declaration, the 1922 Churchill White Paper took the position Palestine had always been excluded from the Arab area. Although this directly contradicted numerous previous government documents, those documents were not known to the public. As part of preparations for this White Paper, Sir John Shuckberg of the British Colonial Office had exchanged correspondence with McMahon; reliance was placed on a 1920 memorandum by Major Hubert Young, who had noted that in the original Arabic text, the word translated as "districts" in English was "vilayets", the largest class of administrative district into which the Ottoman Empire was divided. He concluded "district of Damascus", i.e., "vilayet of Damascus", must have referred to the vilayet of which Damascus was the capital, the Vilayet of Syria. This vilayet extended southwards to the Gulf of Aqaba but excluded most of Palestine.

While some British governments occasionally stated that the intent of the McMahon Correspondence was not to promise Palestine to Hussein, they have occasionally acknowledged the flaws in the legal terminology of the McMahon–Hussein Correspondence that make this position problematic. The weak points of the government's interpretation were acknowledged in a detailed memorandum by the Secretary of State for Foreign Affairs in 1939.

A committee established by the British in 1939 to clarify the arguments said many commitments had been made during and after the war and that all of them would have to be studied together. The Arab representatives submitted a statement from Sir Michael McDonnell to the committee that said whatever meaning McMahon had intended was of no legal consequence because it was his actual statements that constituted the pledge from His Majesty's Government. The Arab representatives also said McMahon had been acting as an intermediary for the Secretary of State for Foreign Affairs, Lord Grey. Speaking in the House of Lords on 27 March 1923, Lord Grey said he had serious doubts about the validity of the Churchill White Paper's interpretation of the pledges he, as Foreign Secretary, had caused to be given to the Sharif Hussein in 1915. The Arab representatives suggested a search for evidence in the files of the Foreign Office might clarify the Secretary of State's intentions.

See also 
 Pan-Arabism

Notes

References

Bibliography

Specialised works

General histories

Works by involved parties 

 
 ; pdf version (0.3 MB); Original pdf  (7.3MB)

External links
 The Arabian Peninsula in 1914—UK National Archives (including information on the Hussein–McMahon Correspondence)

1915 documents
1915 in international relations
1915 in Ottoman Syria
1916 documents
1916 in international relations
1916 in Ottoman Syria
Arab Revolt
Collection of The National Archives (United Kingdom)
Correspondences
Documents of Mandatory Palestine
France in World War I
United Kingdom in World War I
World War I documents